Flor Silvestre con el Mariachi México, vol. 2 is a studio album by Mexican singer Flor Silvestre, released in 1964 by Musart Records.

Background
Although the liner notes describe Flor Silvestre, vol. 2 as Flor Silvestre's "second album of songs", it is actually her third Musart album. Her previous Musart albums are Flor Silvestre and Flor Silvestre con el Mariachi México.

Critical reception
Cashbox included Flor Silvestre, vol. 2 in its Latin Picks section and gave it a rave review:

Track listing
Side one

Side two

Personnel
 Mariachi México de Pepe Villa – accompaniment

References

External links
 Flor Silvestre, vol. 2 at AllMusic

1964 albums
Flor Silvestre albums
Musart Records albums
Spanish-language albums